Dirk Baldinger (born 27 August 1971) is a German former professional racing cyclist, who now works as a directeur sportif for UCI Women's Continental Team . He rode in two editions of the Tour de France, two editions of the Giro d'Italia and two editions of the Vuelta a España.

References

External links

1971 births
Living people
German male cyclists
Sportspeople from Freiburg im Breisgau
Cyclists from Baden-Württemberg